Blake Cooper Griffin is an American actor. He is best known for his roles on HBO Max's Winning Time: The Rise of the Lakers Dynasty, AMC's Preacher, TNT's Animal Kingdom, and Ryan Murphy's Dahmer - Monster: The Jeffrey Dahmer Story. Griffin was also the star of Beerfest: Thirst for Victory, CW Seed's first original film. His notable film work includes D. J. Caruso's Standing Up, Helen Hunt's Ride, Life of a King with Cuba Gooding Jr., and Love Is All You Need?, portraying the role of Bill Bradley.

Early life

Griffin was born in Columbia, South Carolina.  He has one sister.

Career

Griffin is a graduate of the prestigious School of Drama at the North Carolina School of the Arts. Once graduating, he signed with an agent who convinced him to move Los Angeles to begin his career.

Soon after moving to Los Angeles, he performed the role of The Prince, opposite Broadway actress Ashley Brown, in the world symphonic premiere of Snow White and the Seven Dwarfs - A Symphonic Retelling, at the Walt Disney Concert Hall in Los Angeles, with the Hollywood Bowl Orchestra conducted by John Mauceri.

In 2011, Griffin was cast as Trent Rogers on the USA Network drama Necessary Roughness.

In 2014, Deadline Hollywood announced that Griffin had joined the cast of the twenty-something ensemble drama Flipside being executive produced by Mark Feuerstein in conjunction with Wind Dancer Films.

He has appeared on many television shows including Castle, Jessie, Castle, Greek, Law & Order: Criminal Intent, Major Crimes, Mad Love, 90210, NCIS: LA, as well as the NBC television event Game of Your Life, where Griffin starred opposite Leah Thompson. Griffin can be seen in the 2016 made-for-TV movie Before You Say I Do.

In 2016, Griffin was cast in an episode of House of Lies; the episode was directed by Helen Hunt.  He was previously directed by Hunt in the feature film Ride.

Other major film roles include: Eric in Standing Up with Val Kilmer, J. Thomas Gaines in the chess drama Life of a King, and Bill Bradley in 'Love is All You Need? directed by K. Rocco Shields. The film also stars Tyler Blackburn, Emily Osment, Briana Evigan, and Jeremy Sisto.

In 2018, Griffin starred in the CW Seed reboot of the Warner Bros film Beerfest. Beerfest: Thirst for Victory is inspired by the 2006 Broken Lizard/Warner Bros cult classic film; it the first original film from the network. Griffin portrays the character Scott.

Griffin guest starred in Marvel's Cloak & Dagger and the Mad About You Reboot, where he again worked with Helen Hunt. In 2020, it was announced that Griffin would be a part of the fifth season of Animal Kingdom on TNT, portraying the role of Lewis. In 2021, Griffin joined the HBO Max series Winning Time: The Rise of the Lakers Dynasty that chronicles the creation of the Los Angeles Lakers; the series stars John C. Reilly. Griffin is portraying the role of Wesley.

In 2022, Deadline Hollywood announced that Griffin had joined the cast of Dahmer - Monster: The Jeffrey Dahmer Story, the Ryan Murphy and Ian Brennan’s limited series that chronicles the story of one of America’s most notorious serial killers. American Horror Story alum Evan Peters stars as Dahmer and also executive produces. Griffin portrays the role of Charles in the series that will play on Netflix.

Politics and Philanthropy 
In 2016, Griffin joined several other Hollywood actors on the campaign trail as a vocal surrogate for former Secretary of State Hillary Clinton's presidential campaign. Griffin travelled to several battleground states, giving speeches at campaign rallies in support of Clinton. The actor also appeared at various fundraisers and was among the celebrity hosts at the Los Angeles launch of Millennials for Hillary.

In 2017, Griffin gave the keynote speech outside of the Georgia State Capitol building at a rally designed to push back against Congressional efforts to repeal the Affordable Care Act.

Griffin has lent considerable charitable efforts to various anti-bullying causes, routinely appearing at events as a show of support. Griffin even collaborated with NPR to develop a 'listening kit' which examined the topic of bullying in depth.

Ahead of the 2020 Presidential election, Blake acted as a surrogate for Democratic Presidential nominee and former Vice President Joe Biden, posting social media endorsement videos and hosting a #TeamJoeTalks Live on Instagram Live with former Baltimore Mayor Stephanie Rawlings-Blake. Griffin travelled to the battleground state of North Carolina for the campaign the final week of the election, in a get out the vote blitz for the former Vice President and his running mate Kamala Harris, alongside other Hollywood performers including Common.

Filmography

References

External links
 

21st-century American male actors
American male film actors
American male stage actors
American male television actors
Living people
Male actors from Columbia, South Carolina
University of North Carolina School of the Arts alumni
Year of birth missing (living people)